"East Jesus Nowhere" is a song by American rock band Green Day. The single was released on October 19, 2009, as the third single and eighth track from their eighth album 21st Century Breakdown. The title is derived from a phrase in the 2007 film Juno.

Song meaning 
The song rebukes fundamentalist religion and was written by singer/guitarist Billie Joe Armstrong after bassist Mike Dirnt attended a church service where a friend's baby was baptized.

Music video 
The music video was released on September 17, 2009. It shows a montage of live concert footage and pictures from their 21st Century Breakdown World Tour. The video is longer by about 30 seconds, because the bridge of the song is extended, although the studio version of the song is still used instead of a live version. The music video was directed by Chris Dugan and M. Douglas Silverstein.

Chart performance

Personnel 
Billie Joe Armstrong – lead vocals, guitar
Mike Dirnt – bass guitar, backing vocals
Tré Cool – drums, percussion

References 

2009 singles
Green Day songs
Songs critical of religion
Songs written by Billie Joe Armstrong
Song recordings produced by Butch Vig
2009 songs
Reprise Records singles
Songs written by Tré Cool
Songs written by Mike Dirnt